Dr. Manmohan Parida, Sc ‘G’ assumed the charge of Director DRDE, Gwalior with effect from 01st October, 2021. He obtained his graduation in Veterinary Science from Odisha Veterinary College as best graduate with three Gold Medals into his credit. He earned his Masters in Veterinary Virology from prestigious Indian Veterinary Research Institute, Mukteswar and further obtained his Doctorate Jiwaji University, Gwalior in Microbiology. He was also awarded with Monbusho Fellowship from Japanese Govt and pursued Post Doctoral Research Scientist at Institute of Tropical Medicine, WHO reference center for research on arboviruses, Nagasaki, Japan.

Biography 
Dr Parida is a virologist with three decades of scientific and techno managerial experience in the field of Medical Virology. His core areas of research encompasses strategic Biodefence (Biocontainment & Bioverification) R & D with significant contributions in the field of rapid detection technologies, antiviral drug development, new generation vaccine candidates, molecular epidemiology, genotyping, phylogenetic evolution and trafficking of emerging viruses of biomedical importance. He has established National Apex Referral Laboratory for Dengue, Chikungunya, Swine Flu, COVID19 under Infectious Disease Surveillance Programme. He is spearheading the DRDO Biothreat Mitigation Programme and working on establishment Maximum Microbial containment complex (BSL4) facility as a National Biodefence Refferal Laboratory in the country for mitigation of future biothreat emergencies.

He has established advanced molecular diagnostics based on gene amplification technologies (RT-PCR and RT-LAMP) for large number of viruses viz; Dengue, JE, Chikungunya , West Nile, Swine Flu,SARS,COVID19. He has the distinction introducing LAMP technology in India. He has also developed RT-LAMP tests for high risk biothreat viral agents viz, Ebola, Small pox, CCHF, KFD, Nipah viruses through synthetic gene based approach. The Swine Flu RT-LAMP technology has been transferred to M/s RAS Life Science and has been approved by ICMR with DCGI clearance as an alternate indigenous technology to WHO approved CDC RT-PCR. He has also established the Test & Evaluation Facility (Synthetic Blood Penetration, Wet bacterial penetration, Viral penetration) for testing the Biosuits & Biomasks. In addition, He has also developed field deployable mobile containment laboratory “PARAKH” for rapid on site detection which was also used for testing of COVID-19 samples during the on-going pandemic at Mysore Medical College.

He was member of various Inter-ministerial Task forces (ICMR, ICAR, DBT), Technical and Joint working group (TWG & JWG) committees for formulation of policy proposal and guidelines. He has published 139 research papers in peer reviewed journals (with overall C.I.-7213, h-Index-43, i10 Index-96) and supervised 8 Ph D students. He has 3 international patents and 10 national patents granted to his credit. He was ranked among top 10 researchers in the field of Immunology & Microbiology as per DST- Elsevier Bibilometric analysis (2009-14). He is also ranked among top 2% of Scientists of the World in the field of Biomedical Research (Virology) as per the 2021 data base prepared by Stanford University, USA. All these sincere efforts are being recognized through various National awards from DRDO (DRDO Scientist of the Year Award, DRDO Technology Group Award),ICMR (Basanti Devi Amirchand Prize), DBT (National Bioscience Award), DST(Technology commercialization Award) and other academic/professional bodies (NASI-Reliance Platinum Jubilee Award, Samanta Chandra Sekhar Award by Odisha Bigyan Academy) etc. He is also a Fellow of Indian Virological Society.

Born 24 November 1967, Manmohan Parida completed his undergraduate studies in veterinary medicine at the Orissa University of Agriculture and Technology in 1993 and post-graduate studies at the Indian Veterinary Research Institute in 1993 before securing a PhD in microbiology from Jiwaji University in 2002. Subsequently, he joined the Defence Research and Development Establishment of the Defence Research and Development Organisation, where he holds the position of Director. His research focus is in the fields of molecular epidemiology of viral infections, epidemics and public health. His studies have been documented by way of a number of articles and ResearchGate, an online repository of scientific articles has listed 113 of them. Besides, he has contributed chapters to books published by others and has delivered invited lectures. He holds a patent, Oligonucleotides and process for detection of swine flu virus, a process he co-developed with his colleagues at DRDE. The Department of Biotechnology of the Government of India awarded him the National Bioscience Award for Career Development, one of the highest Indian science awards, for his contributions to biosciences, in 2011.

Selected bibliography 
 
 
 </ref>

See also 

 Swine flu
 Chikungunya

Notes

References 

N-BIOS Prize recipients
Indian scientific authors
Living people
Indian medical academics
Indian medical researchers
Indian microbiologists
Indian virologists
Jiwaji University alumni
1967 births
Scientists from Madhya Pradesh
Defence Research and Development Organisation
Indian patent holders
21st-century Indian inventors